Merdigera is a genus of small air-breathing land snails, terrestrial pulmonate gastropod mollusks in the subfamily Eninae of the family Enidae.

Species
Species in this genus include:
 Merdigera invisa 	Kijashko, 2006
 Merdigera obscura (Müller, 1774) - the type species of the genus Merdigera

References

 Bank, R. A. (2017). Classification of the Recent terrestrial Gastropoda of the World. Last update: July 16th, 2017

External links
 Held, F. (1837-1838). Notizen über die Weichthiere Bayerns. Isis (Oken), 30 (4): 303-309 (1837); 30 (12): 901-919 (1838). Leipzig
 Merdigera at AnimalBase

Enidae
Gastropod genera